The White City Rebels were a motorcycle speedway team who operated from the White City Stadium, Wood Lane in London.

History
White City were inaugural members of the Southern League in 1929 but only raced for the one season. The White City team were due to race in the 1930 Southern League, but they withdrew from the league before it started. The stadium then ran once again using an Open Licence and held occasional one-off meetings between (1953–1958, 1961) until a new league team was formed, from the Oxford Rebels team in 1976. They re-opened in 1976 under the promoters Danny Dunton and Bob Dugard. They were managed by Danny Dunton's son, Lee Dunton. They had previously raced at Oxford as the Oxford Rebels, but a threat of track closure and sell-off for development in 1975 caused the promoters to seek a new venue.

In 1977, White City Rebels won the 1977 British League season title in only their second season of existence. The London team caused a surprise with their consistent form throughout the season with heavy scoring of Gordon Kennett leading the team. The success came from a group of five other riders hitting around a seven average to support Kennett. The five were Englishmen Mike Sampson, Steve Weatherley and Trevor Geer, Pole Marek Cieślak and Finn Kai Niemi.

The team closed after only three seasons due to poor crowds levels, despite finishing the 1977 season as champions of the British League. The teams riders and assets were sold to Eastbourne Eagles.

Notable riders
Gordon Kennett
Steve Weatherley
Trevor Geer
Marek Cieślak
Kai Niemi
Mike Sampson
Trevor Geer

Season summary

References

Defunct British speedway teams
Speedway teams in London
White City, London